Cuiyun may refer to:

 Cuiyun Station, Chongqing, China
 Simao District, Yunnan, China, formerly known as Cuiyun District